The Vale of Glamorgan Borough Council was the local authority for the Vale of Glamorgan in South Glamorgan, Wales, created in 1974 and reconstituted in 1996 as the Vale of Glamorgan Council unitary authority. It was a second tier district authority, with South Glamorgan County Council providing county-level services to the area.

History
Vale of Glamorgan Borough Council and Cardiff City Council were created as district authorities, upon the creation of the county of South Glamorgan on 1 April 1974. The Vale of Glamorgan covered the whole area of three former districts, and parts of another two districts, which were abolished on the creation of the new council:
Barry Municipal Borough
Cardiff Rural District (part)
Cowbridge Municipal Borough
Cowbridge Rural District (part)
Penarth Urban District

Under the Local Government (Wales) Act 1994, South Glamorgan County Council was abolished and Vale of Glamorgan became a unitary authority, taking over the provision of the services previously provided by the county council in its area. The borough boundaries were also amended, gaining the communities of Wick, St Brides Major, and Ewenny from the borough of Ogwr.

Political control
The first election to the council was held in 1973, initially operating as a shadow authority alongside the outgoing authorities until it came into its powers on 1 April 1974. Political control of the council from 1974 until the council's abolition in 1996 was held by the following parties:

In 1973, 41 councillors were elected from fourteen wards, in preparation for the new council. This increased to 49 councillors elected from 18 wards at the next election, in 1976.

At the 1983 election, the number of councillors reduced to 46 though the number of wards increased to twenty-one.

The council elected a mayor annually.

Premises

The council was initially based at Barry Town Hall, which had been built in 1908 for the Barry Borough Council, one of the council's predecessors. In 1981 the council moved to a new building called the Civic Offices on Holton Road in Barry.

Electoral divisions
As a result of The Borough of Vale of Glamorgan (Electoral Arrangements) Order 1982, between 1983 and 1996 the borough was divided into 21 electoral wards returning 46 councillors:

References

1974 establishments in Wales
1996 disestablishments in Wales
District councils of Wales
Organisations based in the Vale of Glamorgan
Politics of the Vale of Glamorgan